Phycomorpha bryophylla is a moth in the family Copromorphidae. It was described by Edward Meyrick in 1927. It is found on Samoa.

References

Copromorphidae
Moths described in 1927